Íñigo Chaurreau Bernárdez (born April 14, 1973 in Pasaia) is a Spanish former professional cyclist. His cousin Mikel Astarloza also competed professionally.

Major results

1994
 3rd Overall Circuito Montañés
1995
 10th Clasica de Sabiñánigo
1999
 5th Subida al Naranco
 8th Overall Volta ao Alentejo
 9th Overall Grande Prémio Jornal de Notícias
2000
 1st Mountains classification Vuelta a La Rioja
 5th Overall Euskal Bizikleta
 8th Overall Vuelta a Asturias
2001
 8th Overall Criterium du Dauphiné Libére
 9th Overall Route du Sud
2003
 1st  Time trial, National Road Championships
 6th Overall Critérium du Dauphiné Libéré
 6th Classique des Alpes
 10th Overall Tour de Romandie
 10th Subida al Naranco
2005
 4th Overall Criterium des Espoirs
 8th Overall Rheinland-Pfalz-Rundfahrt

Grand Tour general classification results timeline

References

External links

1973 births
Living people
Spanish male cyclists
People from Pasaia
Sportspeople from Gipuzkoa
Cyclists from the Basque Country (autonomous community)